Aeroporto Internacional do Recife/Guararapes – Gilberto Freyre  is the airport serving Recife, Brazil.

It is operated by AENA.

Some of its facilities are shared with the Recife Air Force Base of the Brazilian Air Force.

History
Originally called Ibura Airport, the airport had its name changed to Guararapes Airport in 1948. The facility originated at the time of World War II, when a new airport was built to replace the earlier airfield, Parque do Encanta Moça. With the end of the War, the facility became strategically important as a technical and refueling stop on the route from South America to Europe.

On 18 January 1958, a new passenger terminal was inaugurated, replacing the original facility.

In 1979, an agreement with Infraero was made in order to further develop the airport complex. The passenger terminal underwent its first major renovation in 1982 and another enlargement in 1990.

In 2004 a brand-new passenger terminal was built, including a new shopping mall, thus generating more traffic and revenue. Furthermore, a new concourse was opened in 2004 and the airport's capacity increased from 1.5 to 9 million passengers/year.

On 31 August 2009 Infraero unveiled a BRL 8.75 million (US$4.6 million; EUR 3.2 million) investment plan to upgrade Guararapes International Airport, focusing on the preparations for the 2014 FIFA World Cup in Brazil, Recife being one of the venue cities. The investment was spent in finishing the passenger terminal renovation, installing 8 more jetways. The work was completed on 1 July 2011, and the airport was then considered ready for the FIFA Cup.

Previously operated by Infraero, on March 15, 2019 AENA won a 30-year concession to operate the airport.

The Brazilian Integrated Air Traffic Control and Air Defense Center, section 3 (Cindacta III) is located in the vicinity of the airport.

Airlines and destinations

Passenger

Cargo

Accidents and incidents
1 November 1961: a Panair do Brasil Douglas DC-7C registration PP-PDO flying from Sal to Recife, during its final approach struck an 84-m hill 2.7 km from the runway and broke up. The aircraft was doing a night approach too low and outside the regular traffic pattern. Forty-five passengers and crew out of the 88 persons aboard died. The aircraft was operating the Voo da amizade (Friendship Flight).
11 November 1991: a Nordeste Embraer EMB110P1 Bandeirante registration PT-SCU, operating flight 115 from Recife to Maceió, during on initial climb had an engine failure followed by fire. The aircraft crashed on a populated area. All 13 aircraft occupants and 2 persons on the ground died.
13 July 2011: a Noar Linhas Aéreas Let L-410 Turbolet registration PR-NOB operating flight 4896 from Recife to Natal crashed shortly after take-off from Recife. All 16 occupants were killed.

Access

The subway Airport Station is connected to the terminal by a footbridge. Main bus lines that serve the neighborhoods of Boa Viagem and Cidade Universitária in Recife and Piedade, neighborhood of   Jaboatão dos Guararapes stop at the airport.

See also
List of airports in Brazil
Recife Air Force Base

References

External links

Airports in Pernambuco
Buildings and structures in Recife
Airfields of the United States Army Air Forces Air Transport Command on the South Atlantic Route